Kandilli Ski Resort is a ski resort for cross-country skiing and biathlon in Erzurum Province, eastern Turkey.

It was established in 2010 
for the 2011 Winter Universiade. The resort is open to the public the year around.

International events hosted
 2011 Winter Universiade, 27 January – 6 February – snowboarding and freestyle skiing competitions.
 2017 European Youth Olympic Winter Festival, 12 – 17 February – Biathlon and cross-country skiing.

References

Sports venues in Erzurum
Ski areas and resorts in Turkey
Buildings and structures in Erzurum Province
2010 establishments in Turkey
Sports venues completed in 2010
Tourist attractions in Erzurum Province
Aşkale District